Vance Township, population 52,497, is one of nine townships in Union County, North Carolina. This township includes the a small part of the City of Monroe, the towns of Indian Trail, Hemby Bridge, and Stallings, and the villages of Lake Park and Wesley Chapel.

Geography
The extreme northern part of the township is drained by Goose Creek.  Further to the south is drained by North Fork Crooked Creek, while the central part is drained by South Fork Crooked Creek.  The south-central part of the township is drained by Price Mill Creek and going further south is drained by East Fork of Twelvemile Creek.  The southwestern part of the township is drained by S Fork of Twelvemile Creek.

References

Townships in Union County, North Carolina
Townships in North Carolina